Films produced in France in 1923:

See also
1923 in France

References

External links
French films of 1923 on IMDb
French films of 1923 at Cinema-francais.fr

1923
Lists of 1923 films by country or language
Films